Rear Admiral Simon Paul Williams,  is a retired senior Royal Navy officer who served as Naval Secretary, Assistant Chief of Naval Staff (Personnel) and Flag Officer (Maritime Reserves) from March 2015 to June 2018.

Early life and education
Williams was educated at Kingsbridge School, the City University London and the Britannia Royal Naval College.

Naval career
Williams joined the Royal Navy in 1978. After taking charge of the minesweeper , he became Commanding Officer of the frigate  in 2001 and of the frigate  in 2005.

Williams became Director of Naval Personnel Strategy at the Ministry of Defence in 2008, Commodore of the Britannia Royal Naval College in March 2011 and then Defence Services Secretary as well as Assistant Chief of the Defence Staff (Personnel and Training) in October 2012. He went on to be Naval Secretary, Assistant Chief of Naval Staff (Personnel) and Flag Officer (Maritime Reserves) in March 2015.

Williams was appointed a Companion of the Order of the Bath in the 2017 Birthday Honours.

References

 

|-

Graduates of Britannia Royal Naval College
Alumni of City, University of London
Commanders of the Royal Victorian Order
Royal Navy admirals
Companions of the Order of the Bath
Living people
Year of birth missing (living people)